Sheezus is the third studio album by English singer Lily Allen. It was released on 2 May 2014 by Parlophone. The album is Allen's first work since her musical hiatus in 2009, after the release of her second studio album, It's Not Me, It's You (2009). In June 2012, Allen announced that she would be returning to music, revealing that she had been recording a new album and that she would be returning to the use of her professional name.

Sheezus features production from longtime collaborator Greg Kurstin, along with the likes of Shellback, DJ Dahi and Fraser T. Smith. Upon release, Sheezus received generally mixed reviews from music critics. The album debuted at number one on the UK Albums Chart, becoming Allen's second consecutive number-one album.

The album was preceded by the release of two singles. The lead single "Hard out Here" was released on 17 November 2013 and entered the UK Singles Chart at number nine, giving Allen two simultaneous top-10 singles. "Air Balloon" was released as the second single from the album, peaking at number seven on the UK Singles Chart.

Background
Allen released her second album It's Not Me, It's You in 2009, which saw a genre shift to electropop, rather than the ska and reggae influences used in her debut album Alright, Still (2006). The album debuted at number one on the UK Albums Chart and the Australian Albums Chart and was well received by critics, noting the singer's musical evolution and maturity. It spawned the commercially successful singles "The Fear" and "Fuck You", popular mostly in Europe. Allen and Amy Winehouse were credited with starting a process that led to the media-proclaimed "year of the women" in 2009 that saw five female artists making music of "experimentalism and fearlessness" nominated for the Mercury Prize.
In 2009, Allen announced that she would be taking a hiatus from musical activities. The following year, she opened a fashion rental shop named Lucy in Disguise with her sister Sarah, followed by the 2011 launching of her own record label.

Recording

Allen said in October 2012 that she was in the studio, "throwing shit in the wall and seeing if anything sticks ... It's great to work at my own pace with no commitments other than to make music." In February 2013, she performed live at a Paris fashion show produced by Mark Ronson in what she called her "mumback", and foreshadowed the release of a new album "inspired by her experiences of motherhood" by the end of 2013.

In 2013, Allen revealed that she had begun working on her third studio album. On 20 June 2012, Allen tweeted that she was in the studio working with Greg Kurstin on new music. She changed her professional name from Lily Allen to Lily Rose Cooper. In August 2013 she changed her professional name back to Allen and tweeted new music would be arriving "soon".
Allen confirmed in an interview with BBC Radio 1 on 19 November 2013 that she was to perform at the 2014 Glastonbury Festival. She also revealed that she wrote a song for the album inspired by a Twitter feud with Azealia Banks that happened in summer 2013. Sheezus was predominantly produced by longtime collaborator Greg Kurstin, with whom Allen had worked on her first and second studio albums. Other collaborations came from DJ Dahi, who produced the album's title track, and Shellback, who produced "Air Balloon".

Composition
Sheezus contains a "diverse mix of vibrant pop hooks, snappy commentary and a fearlessly perceptive outlook." Allen's sound, aesthetic, and lyricism on the album has been described as a return to "the same firecracker who turned heads in the mid-'00s with eclectic, post-hip-hop tunes and bullshit-slaying lyrics". The album's opening track "Sheezus" is a "sarcastic pop" song, containing "anti-pop" lyrics that namecheck artists such as Lady Gaga, Rihanna, Katy Perry, Beyoncé and Lorde. "L8 CMMR" is a bubblegum pop and electropop song, whose lyrics describe Allen's obsession with her male lover.
"Air Balloon" is a bubblegum pop song that was described by Billboard as "more of a loopy lullaby than a slice of social commentary", the song contains a toy piano arrangement and creaseless beat. "Our Time" is song built over "synth pop swirls", described as having a "carefree attitude". "Insincerely Yours" is a funk song that contains a "narrative of blunt truths and gutsy celeb culture sneers." The track namechecks models Cara Delevingne and Jourdan Dunn, as well as singer Rita Ora; Allen stated that the song is "not about them, it's about the idea of them—how the media perceive them. It's about how the way  the media perceive them as entities and how that actually has nothing to do with how they are in real life."

"Take My Place" is a song that lyrically is about Allen's first child who she lost through a stillbirth in 2010. "As Long as I Got You" contains a "jittery" harmonica and revolves around the theme of married life and Allen's partying past. "URL Badman" is a response to the controversy surrounding Allen's music video for Hard out Here. Layered over "ironic" dubstep wobbles, the song was described as "an astute slap across the faceless nature of the blogosphere". On "Silver Spoon", Allen lambasts all the critics who continually attribute her success to her privileged upbringing, echoing the "snarky charm" of her previous albums, Alright, Still and It's Not Me, It's You. "Hard out Here" is a "typically outspoken, sweary" synth-pop song. Lyrically, it speaks about "body image pressures and misogyny in the entertainment industry".

Singles
"Hard out Here" was released as the album's lead single on 17 November 2013. Upon release, "Hard out Here" was met with critical acclaim, with critics praising the song's feminist themes. The single debuted at number nine on the UK Singles Chart, selling 30,213 copies in its first week. The song's accompanying music video was a subject of controversy, with Allen accused of being racist for its use of mostly black dancers in an allegedly "disapproving" manner. Allen responded that ethnicity was not a factor in hiring the dancers, and the video was a light-hearted satirical look at objectification of women in modern pop music.

"Air Balloon" premiered on BBC Radio 1 on 13 January 2014, and was released on 20 January 2014 as the second single from the album. The song reached number seven on the UK Singles Chart.

"Our Time" was released as the album's third single on 10 March 2014, peaking at number 43 on the UK Singles Chart. The song was serviced to radio in the UK and Italy on 24 March and 14 April, respectively.

"URL Badman" was released on 13 July 2014 as the fourth single from the album.

"As Long as I Got You" was released on 24 August 2014 as the fifth and final single. The music video was filmed at the Glastonbury Festival 2014 and released on 24 July.

Other songs
"Somewhere Only We Know" was released on 10 November 2013 and was used as the John Lewis 2013 Christmas advertisement.

"Sheezus" was released as a promotional single on 22 April 2014. According to Allen, the song was not released as an "official single" due to its use of the word "period".

"L8 CMMR" was used for the television series Girls, and received a lyric video as well. It was also featured in episode 12 of Quantico.

Release and promotion
In December 2013, Allen was announced as one of the newest signees at Warner Bros. Records, following Warner Music Group's acquisition of Parlophone from Universal Music Group in May 2013. In an interview with Graham Norton on The Graham Norton Show on 21 February 2014, Allen confirmed that her third studio album would be titled Sheezus, saying that it is "a little nod to Kanye West", who had released the album Yeezus in 2013. Allen released the album's artwork and track listing on 10 March 2014, the artwork features Allen sitting outside a stately home with Corgis, while the building is engraved with the Latin phrase divide et impera translated to "divide and rule". The same day, Sheezus was made available for pre-order along with the song "Our Time".

On 14 November 2013, Allen made her debut live performance of "Hard out Here" in the YoYos pod at the Red Bull Revolutions in Sound event on the London Eye. During an interview with Graham Norton on The Graham Norton Show on 21 February 2014, Allen performed the album's second single, "Air Balloon". On 24 May 2014, Allen performed "Sheezus", "Hard Out Here", "URL Badman" and "Our Time" as part of her set at BBC Radio 1's Big Weekend in Glasgow.

Allen played at Glastonbury Festival on 27 June 2014, where she also recorded a video for "As Long as I Got You". Moreover, to promote the album, Allen embarked on the Sheezus Tour, which took place in Europe, Australia and North America.

Critical reception

Sheezus received mixed reviews from music critics. At Metacritic, which assigns a weighted mean rating out of 100 to reviews from mainstream critics, the album received an average score of 60 based on 29 reviews, indicating "mixed or average reviews". 

In his review for The Guardian, journalist Alexis Petridis said Allen seems timid lyrically and musically inconsistent on an album that is "far from terrible – indeed, in parts it's very sharp". NME magazine's Laura Snapes was more critical and derided the lyrics as egotistical, clichéd, lacking conviction, and plagued by "empty grandstanding, trying to say something about female oppression, but not knowing quite what". Stephen Thomas Erlewine, writing for AllMusic, felt only "Life for Me", "Insincerely Yours", and "URL Badman" showcase Allen's usually sharp songwriting, as "many of these songs falter on their specificity; she's traded incisive commentary for pedantic details paired with music that winds up diminished by her weariness." Stephanie Benson of Spin believed Allen's message in her lyrics about marriage and womanhood are inconsistent with the party themes on other songs: "Her attempt at convincing us she's a loving wife and mother of two, a savvy feminist, and a satirical mastermind mostly comes off as disingenuous."

In a positive review for the Chicago Tribune, Greg Kot argued that Sheezus is a modest but successful pop album that "connects because it's more conversational than confrontational, a personal statement that dabbles in pop rather than trying to embody the pop moment." Andy Gill of The Independent found both the music and themes diverse, which he felt "clinches the album's success, confirming that this is an artist with taste and opinions of her own, not just a schedule and a fanbase to satisfy". Robert Christgau was impressed by how melodic some of the songs are and Allen's take on marriage in her lyrics, writing in his review for Cuepoint: "Even when that bliss devolves into a painful argument, she can put it into song, and though the bite that was her premarital specialty has softened, give her credit—marital bliss is a theme few lyricists sharpen much at all."

Sheezus was placed at number 47 on The Daily Telegraphs list of 2014's best albums. Christgau ranked it 32nd on his year-end list for The Barnes & Noble Review.

Commercial performance
Sheezus debuted atop the UK Albums Chart with first-week sales of 35,414 copies, becoming Allen's second consecutive number-one album. As of June 2018, it had sold 113,054 copies in the United Kingdom. In the United States, the album debuted at number 12 on the Billboard 200, selling 17,000 copies in its first week. In Japan, it sold 1,931 copies to enter the Oricon Weekly Albums Chart at number 26. The album debuted at number 23 on the French Albums Chart with 2,300 copies sold in its first week.

Track listing

Notes
  signifies a co-producer
  signifies a remixer
 The track "Interlude" only appears on the standard edition as a hidden track.

Personnel

Standard edition
Credits adapted from the liner notes of Sheezus.

Musicians

 Lily Allen – lead vocals
 Alex Burey – guitar 
 Greg Kurstin – keyboards ; programming ; drums ; piano ; guitar ; bass ; accordion 
 Shellback – background vocals, keyboards, programming 
 Kevin Dukes – lap steel ; Dobro 
 Aaron Sterling – drums 
 Paul Beard – arrangements, piano, percussion, programming 
 James Banbury – string arrangements 
 Andy Cook – string arrangement assistance 
 Matt Doughty – string arrangement assistance 
 Will Hicks – string arrangement assistance 
 Paul Sayer – acoustic guitar 

Technical

 DJ Dahi – production 
 Sean Tallman – mixing 
 Doron Dina – mixing assistance 
 Mike Reeves – additional engineering 
 Greg Kurstin – production, engineering ; mixing 
 Serban Ghenea – mixing 
 Alex Pasco – additional engineering ; engineering assistance 
 John Hanes – engineering for mix 
 Tim Roberts – engineering assistance 
 Shellback – production 
 Ilya Salmanzadeh – engineering assistance 
 Robert Möllard – engineering assistance 
 Jesse Shatkin – additional engineering 
 Mike Horner – recording assistance 
 Rob MacFarlane – recording assistance 
 Kevin Dukes – lap steel recording ; Dobro recording 
 Aaron Sterling – drum recording 
 Will Hicks – additional vocal recording 
 Matt Doughty – additional vocal recording 
 Julian Burg – additional engineering 
 Fryars (Benjamin Garrett) – production, mixing 
 Paul Beard – production, co-mixing 
 Joe Kearns – engineering, co-mixing 
 Geoff Pesche – mastering 
 Stuart Hawkes – mastering 

Artwork
 Aimee Phillips – creative direction, art direction, design
 Lily Allen – art direction, design
 Richard Welland – art direction, design
 Jamie Nelson – photography
 Michael Whitham – commissioning

Deluxe edition bonus disc
Credits adapted from the liner notes of the deluxe edition of Sheezus.

Musicians

 Greg Kurstin – bass, drums, keyboards 
 DJ Dahi – programming, keyboards 
 Ben Esser – drums, percussion 
 Benjamin Garrett – piano, bass ; programming ; all parts 
 LaDonna Marie Harley-Peters – backing vocals 
 Tim Rice-Oxley – backing vocals, piano 
 Fraser T. Smith – guitars, keyboards 
 Sam Skirrow – bass guitar 
 Ash Soan – drums 
 Paul Beard – arrangements, piano, percussion, programming 
 James Banbury – string arrangements 
 Andy Cook – string arrangement assistance 
 Matt Doughty – string arrangement assistance 
 Will Hicks – string arrangement assistance 
 Paul Sayer – acoustic guitar 

Technical

 Greg Kurstin – production, mixing, engineering 
 Alex Pasco – additional engineering 
 Fryars (Benjamin Garrett) – co-production 
 DJ Dahi – co-production 
 Sean Tallman – mixing 
 Mike Horner – engineering 
 Fraser T. Smith – production, recording 
 Graham Archer – mixing, recording 
 Paul Beard – production, co-mixing 
 Joe Kearns – engineering, co-mixing 
 Geoff Pesche – mastering 
 Stuart Hawkes – mastering

Charts

Weekly charts

Year-end charts

Certifications

Release history

Notes

References

External links

 

2014 albums
Albums produced by DJ Dahi
Albums produced by Fryars
Albums produced by Greg Kurstin
Albums produced by Shellback (record producer)
Contemporary R&B albums by English artists
Electropop albums
Lily Allen albums
Parlophone albums
Warner Records albums